John Green (September 15, 1924 – August 4, 1981) was an American football player and coach.  He played college football at Tulane University in 1942 and was then appointed to the United States Military Academy where he played from 1943 to 1945.  At Army, Green was a two-time All-American and played on consecutive national championship-winning teams in 1944 and 1945.  Green served as the head football coach at Vanderbilt University from 1963 to 1966, compiling a record of 7–29–4.  He was elected to the College Football Hall of Fame as a player in 1989.

Head coaching record

References

External links
 

1924 births
1981 deaths
People from Jefferson County, Indiana
People from Shelby County, Kentucky
Players of American football from Kentucky
American football guards
Tulane Green Wave football players
Army Black Knights football players
All-American college football players
College Football Hall of Fame inductees
Coaches of American football from Kentucky
Army Black Knights football coaches
Tulane Green Wave football coaches
Florida Gators football coaches
Vanderbilt Commodores football coaches
Kansas Jayhawks football coaches